Saint Alban is venerated as the first-recorded British Christian martyr, for which reason he is considered to be the British protomartyr. Along with fellow Saints Julius and Aaron, Alban is one of three named martyrs recorded at an early date from Roman Britain ("Amphibalus" was the name given much later to the priest he was said to have been protecting). He is traditionally believed to have been beheaded in Verulamium (modern St Albans) sometime during the 3rd or 4th century, and his cult has been celebrated there since ancient times.

Hagiography 
Alban lived in Roman Britain, but little is known about his religious affiliations, socioeconomic status, or citizenship. According to the most elaborate version of the tale found in Bede's Ecclesiastical History of the English People, in the 3rd or 4th century (see dating controversy below), Christians began to suffer "cruel persecution", and Alban was living in Verulamium. However, Gildas says he crossed the Thames before his martyrdom, so some authors place his residence and martyrdom in or near London. Both agree that Alban met a Christian priest fleeing from persecutors and sheltered him in his house for a number of days. The priest, who later came to be called Amphibalus, meaning "cloak" in Latin, prayed and "kept watch" day and night, and Alban was so impressed with the priest's faith and piety that he found himself emulating him and soon converted to Christianity. Eventually, it came to the ears of an unnamed "impious prince" that Alban was sheltering the priest. The prince gave orders for Roman soldiers to make a strict search of Alban's house. As they came to seize the priest, Alban put on the priest's cloak and clothing and presented himself to the soldiers in place of his guest.

Alban was brought before a judge, who just then happened to be standing at the altar, offering sacrifices to "devils" (Bede's reference to pagan gods). When the judge heard that Alban had offered himself up in place of the priest, he became enraged that Alban would shelter a person who "despised and blasphemed the gods," and, as Alban had given himself up in the Christian's place, Alban was sentenced to endure all the punishments that were to be inflicted upon the priest, unless he would comply with the pagan rites of their religion. Alban refused, and declared, "I worship and adore the true and living God who created all things." (The words are still used in prayer at St Alban's Abbey). The enraged judge ordered Alban to be scourged, thinking that a whipping would shake the constancy of his heart, but Alban bore these torments patiently and joyfully. When the judge realized that the tortures would not shake his faith, he gave orders for Alban to be beheaded.

Alban was led to execution, and he presently came to a fast-flowing river that could not be crossed (believed to be the River Ver). There was a bridge, but a mob of curious townspeople who wished to watch the execution had so clogged the bridge that the execution party could not cross. Filled with an ardent desire to arrive quickly at martyrdom, Alban raised his eyes to heaven, and the river dried up, allowing Alban and his captors to cross over on dry land. The astonished executioner cast down his sword and fell at Alban's feet, moved by divine inspiration and praying that he might either suffer with Alban or be executed for him.

The other executioners hesitated to pick up his sword, and meanwhile, Alban and they went about 500 paces to a gently sloping hill, completely covered with all kinds of wild flowers, and overlooking a beautiful plain. (Bede observes that it was a fittingly beautiful place to be enriched and sanctified by a martyr's blood.)

When Alban reached the summit of the hill, he began to thirst and prayed God would give him water. A spring immediately sprang up at his feet. It was there that his head was struck off, as well as the head of the first Roman soldier who was miraculously converted and refused to execute him. However, immediately after delivering the fatal stroke, the eyes of the second executioner popped out of his head and dropped to the ground, along with Alban's head, so that this second executioner could not rejoice over Alban's death.

In later legends, Alban's head rolled downhill after his execution, and a well sprang up where it stopped.
Upon hearing of the miracles, the astonished judge ordered further persecutions to cease, and he began to honour the saint's death.

St Albans Cathedral now stands near the believed site of his execution, and a well is at the bottom of the hill, Holywell Hill.

Sources
The earliest mention of Alban's martyrdom is believed to be in Victricius's De Laude Sanctorum (The Praise of Saints), c. 396. Victricius had just returned from settling an unnamed dispute among the bishops of Britain. He does not mention Alban by name, but includes an unnamed martyr, who, "in the hands of the executioners told rivers to draw back, lest he should be delayed in his haste." The account closely resembles Alban's martyrdom, and many historians have concluded that this may be a reference to Alban, making it the earliest surviving reference to a British saint. There can be no certainty, however, that the martyr referred to is actually Saint Alban.

The foundational text concerning Alban is the Passio Albani, or the Passion of Alban, which relates the tale of Alban's martyrdom, and Germanus of Auxerre's subsequent visit to the site of Alban's execution. This Passio survives in six manuscripts, with three different recensions, referred to as T, P, and E, the oldest of which dates to the eighth century. The T manuscript is located in Turin, the P manuscript is found in Paris and the E manuscripts (of which there are 4) are at The British Library and Gray's Inn, both in London, and Autun (France) and Einsiedeln (Switzerland). The Passio is very likely the source text of the more well-known accounts found in Gildas and Bede.

Another early text to mention Alban is the Vita Germani, or Life of St Germanus of Auxerre, written about 480 by Constantius of Lyon. The text only very briefly mentions Alban but is an important text concerning his nascent cult. According to the Vita, Germanus visited Alban's grave shortly after defeating the Pelagian heresy in Britain and asked Alban to give thanks to God on his behalf. They once again called on him during their voyage home, and Alban is credited with providing smooth sailing for the voyage back to the continent.

Gildas gives a short account of Alban's martyrdom in his De Excidio et Conquestu Britanniae (c. 570), and Bede gives a much fuller account in his Ecclesiastical History of the English People (c. 730). Gildas calls Alban a martyr of Verulamium but says he crossed the river Thames prior to his execution, during the persecution of Diocletian. Bede's account is much more detailed but sets the events during the reign of Septimius Severus and in the town of Verulamium, where a shrine devoted to Alban had been established by at least 429 AD, when Germanus of Auxerre is said to have visited the cult centre during his tour of Britain. Alban is also briefly mentioned in the Anglo-Saxon Chronicle (c. 900), and by Geoffrey of Monmouth in Historia Regum Britanniae (c. 1136). It is also possible that his martyrdom is referenced in the Acta Martyrum.

Another early source for Saint Alban is the Martyrologium Hieronymianum, or the so-called 'Martyrology of Saint Jerome' in which the entry In Britannia Albani martyris probably occurred originally under 22 June. In fact, in the extant versions, Alban has acquired numerous companions because of confusion/conflation with other entries. The martyrology is preserved in a 9th-century copy but was probably composed in something close to its present form around 600, with the surviving recension showing some signs of being based on a recension compiled at Auxerre (significantly, the hometown of Saint Germanus) For Thornhill (see above), the date given for Alban's martyrdom is striking for its closeness to the summer solstice (on which some variants of the Hieronymianum actually place the saint's day). Being the day when the sun is at its brightest in midsummer, that might suggest that there is indeed some significance in the literal meaning of the name Albanus (or at least the root albho- on which it is based) as 'white' or 'bright'.

Matthew Paris, the celebrated medieval English chronicler and most famous of St Alban's Abbey's monks, produced a beautifully-illustrated Life of St Alban in the 13th century, which is in French verse adapted from a Latin Life of St Alban by William of St Albans, c. 1178. It is now at the Trinity College Library in Dublin.

Disputed topics

Dating 
The date of Alban's execution has never been firmly established. Original sources and modern historians indicate a range of dates between 209 and 313.

The Anglo-Saxon Chronicle lists the year 283, but Bede places it in 305, "when the cruel Emperors first published their edicts against the Christians." In other words, it was sometime after the publication of the edicts by Eastern Roman Emperor Diocletian in 303 and before the proclamation of toleration in the Edict of Milan by co-ruling Roman Emperors Constantine I and Licinius, in 313. Bede was probably following Gildas.

English historian John Morris suggests that Alban's martyrdom took place during the persecutions of Emperor Septimius Severus in 209. Morris bases his claims on the Turin version of the Passio Albani, unknown to Bede, which states, "Alban received a fugitive cleric and put on his garment and his cloak (habitu et caracalla) that he was wearing and delivered himself up to be killed instead of the priest… and was delivered immediately to the evil Caesar Severus." According to Morris St Gildas knew the source but mistranslated the name "Severus" as an adjective, wrongly identifying the emperor as Diocletian. Bede accepted the identification as fact and dates St Alban's martyrdom to this later period.  As Morris points out, Diocletian reigned only in the East and would not have been involved in British affairs in 304; Emperor Severus, however, was in Britain from 208 to 211. Morris thus dates Alban's death to 209. However, the mention of Severus in the Turin version has been shown to be an interpolation into an original text, which mentioned only a iudex  or 'judge'. Subsequent scholars (William Hugh Clifford Frend and Charles Thomas for example) have argued that such a single, localised British martyrdom in 209 would have been unusual, and they have suggested the period of 251–259 (under the persecutors Decius or Valerian) are more likely.

Location
While it is certain that the cult devoted to Saint Alban was established in Verulamium, and his martyrdom was also alleged to have taken place there, the sources are unclear about where he was actually executed. Neither Victricius's De Laude Sanctorum nor the Passio Albani mentions where he was martyred other than that it was in Britain. In the Vita Germani, Germanus visits Alban's tomb and touches droplets of his blood still on the ground, but the text does not name the location of the tomb. It is not until Gildas that Alban was connected with Verulamium.

Historicity
Little is known about the real Alban (estimated to have died c. 209 – 305 AD, depending on interpretations), as there are no contemporaneous accounts of his martyrdom and the major sources on his life were written hundreds of years after his death, containing wondrous embellishments, which may or may not refer to real events.

Saint Alban was long regarded as a genuine martyr saint, the protomartyr of Britain, and for much of the 20th century controversy centred on the date of his martyrdom (see further 'Dating controversy', above). More recently, however, some researchers have taken a more sceptical view about his historicity. In the view of Robin Lane Fox, not only is St Alban's date disputable but so is his very existence.

In 2008 the historian Ian Wood proposed that Alban was an 'invention' of Germanus of Auxerre. Germanus visited Britain in 429, as is known from the nearly-contemporary mention by Prosper of Aquitaine. His chronicle, in the entry for the year 429 (published in 433), states:
Agricola, a Pelagian, the son of the Pelagian bishop Severianus, corrupted the British churches by the insinuation of his doctrine. But at the persuasion of the deacon Palladius, Pope Celestine sent Germanus, bishop of Auxerre, as his representative, and having rejected the heretics, directed the British to the catholic faith.

Meanwhile, it was recorded in the Vita Germani ('Life of St Germanus of Auxerre'), written probably sometime between 450 and 485 by Constantius of Lyons, that he, together with his fellow bishop Lupus, having stamped out the heresy of Pelagianism in Britain, visited the tomb of Saint Alban: 
When this damnable heresy had thus been stamped out, its authors refuted, and the minds of all re-established in the true faith, the bishops visited the shrine of the blessed martyr Alban, to give thanks to God through him. (Vita Germani 12)
The martyr Alban is also mentioned, one more time, in the context of Germanus's return journey, by sea:
Their own merits and the intercession of Alban the Martyr secured for them a calm voyage; and a good ship brought them back in peace to their expectant people.  (Vita Germani 13)

The Vita Germani was long regarded as the earliest source for the martyr Alban, but recent research by Richard Sharpe has suggested the earliest version of the Passio Albani (the official story of the saint's martyrdom) may be even earlier (see below and Sources). Wood's argument was based partly on the idea that the name Albanus is suggestive of Albion as the oldest name for Britain, but for him, the name Alban suggested simply 'the man from Albion' rather than an actual 'personification' of the island and its people. It is, in any case, a part of what suggested to Wood that "it is Germanus who gives Alban a name". That, in turn, encouraged him in his conclusion: 
"The story of the saint's martyrdom seems to have been revealed to, or invented by, Germanus in the context of his anti-Pelagian mission" and in a later article "Alban may, therefore, have been 'discovered' by the bishop of Auxerre".

The argument has been accepted by, for instance, Michael Garcia but disputed by, for instance, Professor Nick Higham, who, in an article written in 2014, noted that since Germanus brought relics of continental saints with him, which, so the Passio relates, he deposits in the tomb of Saint Alban while removing some bloodstained earth to take back to Gaul, he must have known from the start that he would make a visit to the cult-centre of Saint Alban, as part of his campaign against the Pelagian heresy. On this basis he states: "This would make good sense in terms of his mission, claiming Britain's most famous cult for Catholicism". He therefore argues against the conclusion of Woods and Garcia that the martyr Alban was unknown before being invented by Germanus.

Key to the argument is a passage in the T version of the Passio that Sharpe has convincingly argued represents an 'interpolation' to the more original E text. All extant versions of the Passio mention (after describing the story of the saint's martyrdom) Germanus's visit to the tomb of Saint Alban. The E version, followed essentially by the T version, states (in the translation of Sharpe):
When Germanus came to Alban's basilica, carrying with him relics of all the apostles and of several martyrs...
but interpolated at this point in only the T version is 
...Alban had revealed himself to Germanus on his journey, and now, so Germanus himself relates, St Alban met him on the stormy seas. But while he had been keeping vigil at night in his basilica, in the dawn when he had given in to sleep St. Alban appeared to him and communicated to him by revelation to him what had happened at the time of his martyrdom and he made this public in order that the events should be preserved in writing on placards....
after which the T version essentially follows the E version again: 
...he ordered the graves to be opened for him to place precious gifts in the same place, in order that the lodging of a single grave might hold membra of saints brought together from various regions whom heaven had received as equal in merit. Once these were honorably disposed and united, with violent devotion and a pious boldness of faith he took from the place where the blood of the martyr had flowed a lump of earth in which it was visible that the ground was red with blood preserved from the martyr's death while the persecutor was pale. When all these things were revealed and made known a huge crowd of people was brought to god with the help of our Lord Jesus Christ to whom is honour and glory for ever and ever. Amen.

It is possible to deduce from the interpolated passage that the name of the martyr was unknown before being revealed to Germanus, either in a vision he had of the martyr during his sea journey or in the dream he had in the basilica. It is also possible to deduce that it was simply the acta, or 'story of the martyrdom', of an already well known figure that was revealed to Germanus. The acta were then written down in tituli (translated above as 'placards'): that is possibly engraved in the walls of a church with illustrations. This might have been either in a church in Auxerre (Germanus's home town in Gaul) as argued by Sharpe and Wood, or in Britain. If the latter is the case, by being on public display, they might have served to give a definitive version of the saint's martyrdom, which could not be contradicted or reinterpreted (for instance by the addition of 'Pelagian' themes) In any case, it has been argued by Sharpe and Wood that these acta written down in tituli were actually the original, very simple and short, first version of the Passio Albani that has come down in the 'E' and later versions  That is very possible but, of course, quite unprovable, but it seems clear that the Passio originates with the circle of Germanus at Auxerre. As time went on, more and more details and wondrous events were added to the account its most detailed version in the 8th century, in Bede's Ecclesiastical History of the English People.

The location of the tomb of Saint Alban that Germanus visited is most often thought to have been Verulamium, now St Albans. That is on the basis of what is in fact the earliest mention of the martyr Alban in an indigenous British source, in the De Excidio et Conquestu Britanniae probably written in the second quarter of the fifth century, by the British author Gildas. As part of his brief historical account he describes the persecution of Christians in Britain,which he identifies as part of the persecution of Diocletian, adding at the end of a passage about "their graves and the places where they suffered":
"I refer to Saint Alban of Verulam (Verolamiensem), Aaron and Iulius, citizens of Caerleon (Legionum Urbis) and others of both sexes, who in different places, displayed the highest spirit in the battle-line of Christ".  (De Excidio 10)

The Verulamium location is supported by the fact that the topography of the Passio can be broadly, if not quite exactly, matched to that of Verulamium, and Bede describes an important cult of Saint Alban there, by the early eighth century at least. Some doubt, however, is encouraged by the fact that in his account of Albans's martyrdom Gildas (De Excidio 11) describes the martyr as crossing the Thames to his place of execution (at Verulamium/St Alban's there is only the much smaller River Ver), which some have taken as an indication that the actual martyrdom (or the more original version of the story about it) was located in Londinium.

Cult
The hilltop located outside Verulamium eventually became the centre of the cult devoted to Alban. It has been claimed (but doubted by some) that a memoria over the execution point and holding the remains of St Alban may have existed at the site from c. 300, possibly earlier. There was certainly a cult centre of St Alban at Verulamium by the time of Bede c. 731, and the mention in Gildas strongly suggests that it was already in existence by the early sixth century. However, when and how the cult of Saint Alban originated is the subject of some debate: there is little textual or archaeological evidence that a cult of Saint Alban existed before Germanus of Auxerre visited the site in 429. In fact, one version of the Passio Albani says that Germanus did not know the name or story of Saint Alban before visiting the site, and Alban appeared to him in a dream to reveal his identity and martyrdom story. That can be interpreted as suggesting (see above: The Disputed Historicity) that the cult of Saint Alban did not exist before the arrival of Germanus. Germanus is said to have taken away dust from the site, which was still marked with Alban's blood. The cult and veneration of saints was still in its infancy at this time, and it has been suggested that Germanus had a hand in creating and promoting the cult of Saint Alban.

 Gildas writing probably in the second quarter of the fifth century calls Saint Alban Verolamiensis, 'of Verulamium' in a passage that refers to the "graves and places where they suffered" of the early British martyrs. This suggests there was at least a shrine but quite possibly a church to him at Verulamium by then. Certainly, Bede (c. 720) mentions a church there, dedicated to him. Offa of Mercia established a Benedictine Abbey and monastery at the site c. 793, but the abbey was probably sacked and destroyed by the Danes c. 890. It was rebuilt by the Normans, with construction beginning in 1077. By the High Middle Ages, St Albans ranked as the premier abbey in England. The abbey church now serves as the cathedral of the Diocese of St Albans, established in 1877.

In a chapel east of the crossing and high altar are remains of the 14th-century marble shrine of St Alban. In June 2002 a scapula (shoulder blade), believed to be a relic of St Alban, was presented to St Albans Cathedral and placed inside the saint's restored 13th-century shrine. The bone was given by the Church of St Pantaleon in Cologne, Germany News. St Pantaleon's, like St Albans Cathedral a former Benedictine abbey church that had a shrine dedicated to St Alban, has possessed remains believed to be those of St Alban since the 10th century. It is entirely possible that further relics were acquired by the church in the 16th century at the time of the Dissolution of the Monasteries in England, when many such relics were smuggled abroad to prevent their destruction. St Albans Abbey was dissolved in 1539.

The largest relic of St Alban in England is the thigh of the protomartyr preserved at St Michael's Benedictine Abbey, Farnborough, Hampshire, which was transferred from the St Pantaleon's reliquary in the 1950s.

On the Continent
There has also been an extensive cult of Saint Alban on the Continent from an early date such as in Mainz, Cologne and Basel on the Rhine as well as a number of other localities in Switzerland and Italy and a notable concentration in the French Alpine regions and the Rhone Valley. Sometimes, the 'Saint Alban' concerned is regarded as a separate figure, other times, he is alternatively called Albinus (and often identified with 6th c. bishop, Saint Albinus of Angers), and at other times he is identified with the British martyr.

Saint Pantaleon's Church, Cologne holds relics said to be those of the British martyr Alban (as noted above). In fact, although identified with the British martyr, he was locally known as Albinus. His relics were said to have been brought from Rome by Empress Theophanu and placed in St Pantaleon's church in about 984: the relics were miraculously saved from destruction in an accident on the way at a place that a later version of 1502, was identified as Silenen, Switzerland. The original record was in a 12th-century manuscript that alleged that the relics were actually those of the British martyr, having been delivered to Ravenna by Germanus himself and taken from there to Rome. Another church at Cologne is known to have been dedicated to the British Alban from the 12th century.

The Saint Alban of Basel is recorded in the Berne recension of the Martyrologium Hieronymianum of circa 800: "Basilea civitate sancti Albani martyris", where he would appear to be an independent local figure, being celebrated on 24 August but later identified with the Saint Alban of Mainz.

St Alban of Mainz is recorded from 756. He was regarded as a separate figure in sources from Raban Maur's early 9th century martyrology, including a 10th-century Life by Gozwin of 1060–2 However, Hippolyte Delehaye suggested that he very probably represents, in origin, a localised version of the British martyr since his feast date was recorded as June 21 in the Martyrologium Hieronymianum (just a day before that of the British one, who actually appears on the 21st and 22nd in early recensions).

The story in Raban Maur associates Alban of Mainz with a martyred bishop, Aureus of Mainz and two other martyrs, Ursus and Theonestus the latter of whom is said to have originated on the Greek island of Naxos, together with Alban. 
A Saint Alban of Burano (near Altino, Italy), meanwhile was associated with one Domenicus in a legendary tale reminiscent of one told about Dionysus.

Veneration
Alban is remembered in the Church of England with a Lesser Festival on 22 June and he continues to be venerated in the Anglican, Roman Catholic, and Eastern Orthodox Communions. The Fellowship of Saint Alban and Saint Sergius is also named in part after Alban.

Every year, during the weekend closest to his feast day, St Albans Cathedral hosts the "Alban Pilgrimage", with huge puppets re-enacting the events of Alban's martyrdom around the city of St Albans.

Besides his abbey, churches in England dedicated to Saint Alban include the former St Alban, Wood Street in the City of London, St Alban's Church at Holborn in central London, ones in the London suburbs of Teddington, Croydon, Cheam and Ilford, one in Westcliff-on-Sea in Essex, others in Hull and Withernwick in the East Riding of Yorkshire, one in Swaythling, Southampton, one in Northampton, one in a Norwich suburb, one in Bristol, one in Tattenhall, Cheshire and another in Macclesfield, Cheshire.  There is also St Alban's, West Leigh near Havant in Hampshire, and the St Alban the Martyr Parish Church of Highgate, Birmingham (including Ark St Alban's Academy). and St Alban the Martyr Church, Cowley, Oxford.  Finally, a church is dedicated to Saint Alban at Earsdon Village, Northumberland, which is the nearest one to Bede's Holy Island. There is also a St Albans parish and church in Splott, Cardiff.

St Alban is the Patron Saint of the Liberal Catholic Church worldwide.

Outside Britain
Churches, festivals, and places dedicated to Saint Alban outside Britain include the following:

Australia
 Cathedral Church of St Alban the Martyr in Griffith, New South Wales
 Anglican Church of St Alban in Muswellbrook, New South Wales, Australia
 Anglican Church of St Alban the Martyr in Kalangadoo, South Australia
 Multicultural Bible Ministry (MBM) St Albans Anglican Church in Rooty Hill, New South Wales
 Anglican Church of St Alban the Martyr in St Albans, New South Wales
 Anglican Church of St Alban in Marradong, Western Australia
 St Alban's Anglican Church in Boggabilla, New South Wales
 St Alban's Anglican Church in Exeter, New South Wales
 St Alban's Anglican Church in Five Dock, New South Wales
 St Alban's Anglican Church in Lindfield, New South Wales
 St Alban's Anglican Church in Leura, New South Wales
 St Alban's Anglican Chapel at The Southport School, Southport, Queensland
 Liberal Catholic Church of St Alban in Spring Hill, Brisbane, Queensland
 Liberal Catholic Church of St Francis and St Alban in Gordon, Sydney, New South Wales
Places
 St Albans, Victoria is a suburb of Melbourne
 St Albans, New South Wales
 Victoria University, Melbourne has St. Albans Campus

Canada
Alberta
St. Albans Anglican, Brooks
British Columbia 
St. Albans Anglican, Ashcroft
St. Alban Anglican Church, Burnaby
St. Alban Anglican Church, Richmond
Manitoba
St. Alban's Anglican Church in Manitoba, which was built in 1892
New Brunswick
St. Alban's Church, the Anglican Parish of New Bandon, Diocese of Fredericton
St Alban's Anglican Church, Salmon Beach
Newfoundland
St Alban's Anglican Church, Grand Falls-Windsor
Saint Alban the Martyr Anglican Church, Gooseberry Cove
Saint Alban's Anglican Church, New-Wes-Valley
Nova Scotia 
St. Alban's Church, Sydney
Ontario
St. Alban's Cathedral (Kenora)
St Alban's Anglican Church in Ottawa
Cathedral of St. Alban the Martyr in Toronto (1883–1936) – ceased as Cathedral in 1936 and sold for use as a chapel for Royal St. George's College
St Albans Anglican Church, Grand Valley, Ontario
St. Alban the Martyr Anglican Church, Georgetown, Ontario 
St. Alban's Anglican Church, Stella, Ontario on Amherst Island
St. Alban's Anglican Church, Acton, Ontario
St. Alban's Anglican Church, Lincoln, Ontario
St. Alban's Anglican Church, Restoule
St. Alban's Anglican Church, Capreol
St. Alban's Anglican Church, Mattawa, Ontario
Saint Alban the Martyr Anglican Church, Greater Napanee
Prince Edward Island
St. Alban's Church, Anglican, Souris, Prince Edward Island
Saskatchewan
St. Alban's Cathedral (Prince Albert)
Quebec
Fabrique de la Paroisse de Saint-Alban (Le), Saint-Alban

Places
St. Alban's, Newfoundland and Labrador The name was changed from Ship Cove to St. Alban's in 1915.
Saint-Alban, Quebec
 St. Alban's Square, Toronto, Ontario

Denmark
St Alban's Church in Copenhagen, Denmark, which is the city's only Anglican church. It was built to the design of Sir Arthur Blomfield and consecrated in 1887. The connection with Denmark goes back to the Middle Ages where a church dedicated to Saint Alban was built in Odense. Supposedly, the relics of the saint had been brought here, maybe as early as the ninth century. It was in that church that King Canute IV of Denmark (Saint Canute) was murdered in 1086. The original church no longer exists, but the Roman Catholic parish church of Odense, St Alban's Church, was consecrated in 1908.

France
St Alban's Anglican, Strasbourg, France
Church Saint Alban, Elven, France

Places
Saint-Alban-Auriolles inhabitants are called Saint Albanians 
Saint-Alban, Côtes-d'Armor inhabitants are called Albanais
Saint-Alban, Haute-Garonne
Saint-Alban-sur-Limagnole pronounced Sent Aoubo
Saint-Alban-de-Montbel
Saint-Alban-des-Villards
Saint-Alban-Leysse
Saint-Alban-de-Roche
Saint-Alban-d'Hurtières

Germany
Saint Pantaleon's Church, Cologne, a former Benedictine abbey church, has held a shrine to St Alban since the 10th century. Some relics are believed to have ended up in the church in order keep them safe from destruction after the Dissolution of the Monasteries by King Henry VIII of England in the 16th century. In 2002, a collar bone, one of the relics in the shrine, was moved to St Albans Cathedral in England, and placed in the shrine to Saint Alban there.
 in Cologne dates back to 1172 however, it was redesigned in 1668–72 by architect Arnold Gülich. The bell tower dates from 1494, and the facade from 1896. It was heavily bombed in WWII and in 1954, Josef Frings released Alt St. Alban so that the city could incorporate it into the construction of the Gürzenich. The   was built on a new plot of land using materials from Oper Köln, which was demolished in 1958.
Wehrkirche St. Alban und St. Wendelin, 
Benediktinerinnen von St. Alban, Dießen am Ammersee
Saint Alban's Abbey, Mainz Kath. Kirche St. Alban, Mainz
Katholische Kirche St. Alban, Bad Krozingen
Katholische Kirche St. Alban, Heilbronn
St. Alban Kirche, Wallerstein
Wallfahrtskirche St. Alban, Aitrang
Buchloe
Walkertshofen
St. Albani, Göttingen

Ghana
St. Alban Anglican Church, Tema, Ghana

Grenada
 St. Alban's Anglican Church, Mt Moritz

Guatemala
St. Alban’s Anglican/Episcopal Mission, Antigua Guatemala

India
St. Albans CSI Anglican Church, Kottayam

Japan
St. Alban Church, Tochigi
Saint Alban's Anglican-Episcopal Church, Minato City

Kenya
ACK St. Alban's Church in Molo, Kenya
ACK St. Alban Parish Makadara in Nairobi, Kenya

Malaysia
St. Alban Anglican Church, Sarawak

New Zealand
St. Alban's Anglican Church, Lower Hutt
St. Albans Baptist Church, Christchurch
St. Alban's Uniting Church, Christchurch
St. Alban's Anglican Church, Appleby
St. Alban's Church, Porirua
St. Alban's Church, Waingaro
St. Alban the Martyr Anglican Church, Balmoral
St. Albans Presbyterian Church, Palmerston North
Chartwell Cooperating Church of St. Alban's, Hamilton

Places
 St Albans is a suburb of Christchurch

Nigeria
St Alban's Anglican Church, Degema

Philippines
Saint Alban Episcopal Church, Episcopal Diocese of North Central Philippines, Mankayan

Solomon Islands
St Alban Church, Honiara

South Africa
St Albans Cathedral, Pretoria
St Alban's Anglican Church, Kimberley
St. Alban's Church, East London
St Albans Anglican Church, Benoni
St Albans Anglican Church, Johannesburg
St Albans Liberal Catholic Church, Johannesburg
St. Alban the Martyr Anglican Cathedral, Pretoria

Places
St. Alban's College

Switzerland
St.-Alban-Kirche (Basel) (Serbisch-Orthodoxe-Kirche) with sacral predecessors dating back to 1083

United States

St. Albans is the name of a community in the borough of Queens in New York City. In 1899, a year after Queens became part of New York City, the new post office for the 600 residents
was named St. Albans, after St Albans in Hertfordshire, England, which itself was named after Saint Alban. The name had been in use for the area since at least 1894 for the name of the school district,
and the LIRR station was named St. Albans when it opened in 1898.  A 1909 map also shows a St Albans Avenue and a St Albans Place in the area.

The parish church of St Alban's Episcopal Church in Washington, D.C., was erected on Mount Saint Alban in 1854 using a bequest from a young woman, Phoebe Nourse, who earned the money sewing. St Alban's went on to found five mission churches in Washington, four of which still maintain active congregations of their own.  Washington National Cathedral, a cathedral of the Episcopal Church in Washington D.C., is located next to the parish church, which preceded the laying of the Cathedral's cornerstone by 53 years. The St Albans School for Boys, which is affiliated with and was established in 1909 soon after the construction of the Cathedral began, is also named for the saint.

In 1972, a chapel named after St. Alban was erected and later consecrated in the Sabino Catchment area of Tucson, Arizona. The chapel and the congregation later became St. Alban's Church and Parish.  It was in this church that the second Anglican female priest, and first female priest in Arizona, was ordained.

In 1928, St. Alban's Chapel, an Episcopalian church, was established on the campus of Louisiana State University in Baton Rouge, Louisiana.

After undergoing several name changes, St. Albans is the name of a community West of Charleston, West Virginia, the capital of the state.

Incomplete List...
St Alban's Episcopal Church: 
– Hoover, Alabama
– Stuttgart, Arkansas
– Catalina Foothills, Arizona
– Wickenburg, Arizona
– Tucson, Arizona
– Yucaipa, California
– Los Angeles, California
– El Cajon, California
– Arcata, California
– Albany, California
– Windsor, Colorado
– Hartford, Connecticut 
– Wilmington, Delaware
– St. Pete Beach, Florida
– Auburndale, Florida
– Andrews, Florida
– Augusta, Georgia
– Monroe, Georgia
– Chicago, Illinois
– Indianapolis, Indiana
– Fort Wayne, Indiana
– Spirit Lake, Iowa
– Davenport, Iowa
– Monroe, Louisiana 
– Cape Elizabeth, Maine 
– Glen Burnie, Maryland
– Salisbury, Maryland
– Edina, Minnesota
– Minneapolis, Minnesota
– Bay City, Michigan – Manistique, Michigan
– Warren County, Mississippi
– Cape Elizabeth, Maine
– New Brunswick, New Jersey
– Oakland, New Jersey
– McCook, Nebraska
– Syracuse, New York
– Staten Island, New York
– Brooklyn, New York
– Littleton, North Carolina
– Hickory, North Carolina
– Davidson, North Carolina
– Albany, Oregon
– Deschutes County, Oregon
– Tillamook, Oregon
– Newtown Square, Pennsylvania 
– Whitfield, Pennsylvania
– Middle Valley, Tennessee
– El Paso, Texas
– Austin, Texas
– Arlington, Texas
– Hubbard, Texas
– Houston, Texas
– Waco, Texas
– Travis County, Texas
– Annandale, Virginia
– two in Washington, D.C.
– Edmonds, Washington
– Washakie County, Wyoming
– Superior, Wisconsin
– Sussex, Wisconsin
– Spooner, Wisconsin
– Maricopa County, Arizona
– Peoria, Arizona
– Los Banos, California
– Harford County, Maryland
– Arlington, Texas
– Tacoma, Washington
St Alban's Anglican Catholic, Richmond, Virginia
St Albans Church of God in St. Paul Minnesota
St. Albans Chapel, Baton Rouge, Louisiana
Church of St Alban, Philadelphia, PA 
St. Albans Open Air Chapel in Albany County, Wyoming
St. Alban's Catholic Church in Rochester, NY

Places
St. Albans (city), Vermont
St. Albans (town), Vermont
St. Albans School (Washington, D.C.) One of the top US boarding schools.

See also
 Catholic Church in England
 List of early Christian saints
 List of protomartyrs
 Saint Alban's Cross
 St. Alban's Church (disambiguation)
 St. Alban's Episcopal Church (disambiguation)

Notes

References

External links
Bede, Ecclesiastical History Book i.vii: the story of Saint Alban
The Story of Alban on the Cathedral and Abbey Church of St Alban's website
The Latin Text of Bede's chapter on Alban at www.earlychurchtexts.com – also links to online dictionaries
An English translation of Bede's chapter on Alban at www.earlychurchtexts.com

 

304 deaths
Burials at St Albans
4th-century Christian martyrs
4th-century Romans
Saint Alban
Executed British people
Romano-British saints
Year of birth unknown
Anglican saints